Hippotion chloris is a moth of the family Sphingidae. It is known from Kenya.

References

 Pinhey, E. (1962): Hawk Moths of Central and Southern Africa. Longmans Southern Africa, Cape Town.

Endemic moths of Kenya
Hippotion
Moths described in 1907
Moths of Africa